Alamo Placita Park is a city park located in Denver, Colorado that is the namesake of the Alamo Placita, Denver neighborhood.

The park was established in 1911 by condemnation of property owned by Denver mayor Robert W. Speer's Arlington Park Realty Company.  Landscape architect and city planner Saco Reink DeBoer, hired by Speer in 1910, eventually designed the park, and landscape work began in 1927.

The park is listed on the Colorado State Register of Historic Properties, and it was listed on the National Register of Historic Places in 1986.

References

External links
  (map of park only) with 

Parks on the National Register of Historic Places in Colorado
Streamline Moderne architecture in the United States
Buildings and structures completed in 1927
Parks in Denver
National Register of Historic Places in Denver